Northumbria was an Anglo-Saxon kingdom in early medieval England.

Northumbria or Northumbrian may also refer to:


Language
Northumbrian burr, a distinctive uvular pronunciation of R in the traditional dialects of Northumberland and north Durham 
Northumbrian dialect, any of several English language varieties spoken in Northumbria or Northumberland 
Northumbrian Old English

Military
50th (Northumbrian) Division (1908–1919)
50th (Northumbrian) Infantry Division (1920–1945; 1947–1961)
23rd (Northumbrian) Division (1939–1940)

Other uses
Northumbria (European Parliament constituency)
Northumbria (locomotive), an 1830 steam locomotive built by Robert Stephenson
Northumbria (modern), a term denoting the region of north-east England between the Tweed and Tees
Northumbria University, a university located in Newcastle upon Tyne in the North East of England
Earl of Northumbria, a former English title of nobility
HMS Northumbria (M1146) (1954–1988), a British Royal Navy minesweeper
Esso Northumbria, an oil tanker launched in 1969
Country proposed by the Northern Independence Party of England

See also

Team Northumbria (disambiguation)
Northumberland (disambiguation)
North East England